Sir Thomas McCulloch was an early Sheriff of Wigtown

Thomas McCulloch  (1776–1843) was a Scottish-born Canadian Presbyterian minister, author and educator.

Thomas or Tommy McCulloch may also refer to:
Thomas McCulloch (footballer, born 1868) (1868–?), Scottish footballer
Tommy McCulloch (footballer, born 1921) (1921–2001), Scottish footballer
Tommy McCulloch (footballer, born 1934) (1934–2016), Scottish footballer
Tom McCulloch (born 1964), Australian soccer player